Valsonectria is a genus of fungi in the class Sordariomycetes. It consists of six species.

References

External links
Valsonectria at Index Fungorum

Sordariomycetes genera
Bionectriaceae
Taxa named by Carlo Luigi Spegazzini